The Fox Farm site is a Middle Fort Ancient culture Manion Phase (1200 to 1400 CE) archaeological site located near Mays Lick in Mason County, Kentucky. It was added to the National Register of Historic Places on May 9, 1983.

References

Fort Ancient culture
Native American history of Kentucky
Pre-Columbian archaeological sites
Archaeological sites on the National Register of Historic Places in Kentucky
National Register of Historic Places in Mason County, Kentucky
Former populated places in Kentucky